The Central District of Omidiyeh County is a district (bakhsh) in Omidiyeh County, Khuzestan Province, Iran. At the 2006 census, its population was 70,037, in 14,447 families.  The district has one city: Omidiyeh.  The district has two rural districts (dehestan): Asiab Rural District and Chah Salem Rural District.

References 

Omidiyeh County
Districts of Khuzestan Province